The 2013 Campeonato Paulista de Futebol Profissional da Primeira Divisão - Série A1 (officially the Paulistão Chevrolet 2013 for sponsorship reasons ) was the 112th season of São Paulo's top professional football league.

It was won for the 27th time by Corinthians, after beating Santos at the finals, the defending champions from the previous three seasons.

Format
The top eight teams in the First Stage qualifies to the Quarter-Finals. The bottom four teams will be relegated to the Série A2. Quarter and Semi-Finals will be played in one-legged matches.
The best-four teams not qualified to the Semi-Finals not from the city of São Paulo or Santos FC, will compete in the Campeonato do Interior.

Teams

Source: Futebol Paulista

First stage

League table

Results

Knockout stage

Bracket

Troféu do Interior

Statistics

Top goalscorers

Source:

Scoring

 First goal of the season: Luís Fabiano for São Paulo against Mirassol (19 January 2013)
 Fastest goal of the season: 2 minutes, Márcio Diogo for XV de Piracicaba against Palmeiras (3 February 2013)
 Largest winning margin: 6 goals
Mogi Mirim 6–0 Botafogo (27 April 2013)
 Highest scoring game: 8 goals
Mirassol 6–2 Palmeiras (27 March 2013)
 Most goals scored in a match by a single team: 6 goals
Mirassol 6–2 Palmeiras (27 March 2013)
 Most goals scored in a match by a losing team: 3 goals
Mirassol 4–3 Botafogo-SP (16 February 2013)
Mirassol 3–4 São Bernardo (16 March 2013)

Discipline

 Most yellow cards (club): 82
 Botafogo-SP
 Most yellow cards (player): 11
 Dudu (São Bernardo)
 Most red cards (club): 12
 Botafogo-SP
 Most red cards (player): 3
 Cris (Botafogo-SP)

Awards

Team of the year

Player of the Season
The Player of the Year was awarded to Neymar.

Young Player of the Season
The Young Player of the Year was awarded to Rodrigo Biro.

Countryside Best Player of the Season
The Countryside Best Player of the Year was awarded to Roni.

Top scorer of the Season
The top scorer of the season was William, who scored 13 goals.

References

Campeonato Paulista seasons
Paulista